Jamie Crysdale (born December 14, 1968 in Calgary, Alberta) is a former offensive lineman for the Calgary Stampeders from 1993 to 2005. He played in three Grey Cups for the Stampeders, winning two. He was an CFL Western Division All-Star centre in 1998.

References

1968 births
Living people
Calgary Stampeders players
Canadian football offensive linemen
Cincinnati Bearcats football players
Canadian football people from Calgary
Players of Canadian football from Alberta